Gaby König-Vialkowitsch (born 5 July 1971) is a German former footballer who played as a midfielder. She made three appearances for the Germany national team from 1991 to 1993.

References

External links
 

1971 births
Living people
German women's footballers
Women's association football midfielders
Germany women's international footballers
Place of birth missing (living people)